Isinglass is a material prepared from the air bladders of fish and used for various functions including beer making as a flocculator, to make gelatinous substances, an egg preservative and for parchment conservation. 

Isinglass may also refer to:

 Mica, a phyllosilicate mineral of aluminium and potassium. Sheet mica is sometimes used to make small windows
 Isinglass (horse), a British Thoroughbred racehorse
 Isinglass River, in New Hampshire, United States
 Project Isinglass, a United States Central Intelligence Agency aircraft study